Jake Needham may refer to:

 Jake Needham (cricketer) (born 1986), English cricketer
 Jake Needham (novelist), American novelist